Louis Durra (aka John Louis Durra) is an American pianist and composer living in Berlin, Germany.

Discography
 Rocket Science—CD, (September 2012)
 Head Radio Retransmissions -- (1 track on ESC Radiohead compilation CD) 2012 ESC Records
 The Best Of All Possible Worlds—CD, 2012–7 weeks on CMJ Jazz Top 40 Radio Charts. 
 Mad World EP—CD, 2011
 Tangled Up In Blue EP—CD, 2011
 What We Have—CD, 2007
 Caught! Louis Durra Trio Live And In The Studio—DVD, 2007
 Dreaming—CD, 2003

(Other Projects)

 2011—A Singer Named Shotgun Throat—Moris Tepper 
 2006-2011—piano for 9 documentaries, composer Miriam Cutler
 2008—Chinese Leftovers— Sugarplum Fairies 
 2008—One Day— Logan Heftel
 2007 -- "Play It Cool" Cast Album—Mark Winkler
 2003—Introspective Raincoat Student Music—Sugarplum Fairies
 2002—Flake—Sugarplum Fairies
 2000—Moth to Mouth—Moris Tepper
 1996—Big Enough to Disappear—Moris Tepper

Touring and performing

 Jazz Bar in Edinburgh, UK. 2012
  Jazz Bar in Edinburgh, UK. 2011
 South Beverly Grill, Beverly Hills, CA since 2010.
 Bandera, Brentwood, CA since 2012.
 Pianist for Richard Shelton 2011
 Pianist for Taylor Negron and Lili Haydn 2007
 Pianist for Steve Zee. 2009-2011
 Music Director for "Play It Cool".  Louis was nominated in 2006 for an Ovation Award and Los Angeles Drama Circle Award for Musical Direction, for the production of Play it Cool at the Celebration Theatre
 Pianist for "Just In Time" in Russia, Ukraine, Latvia and Kazakhstan. 2003
 Pianist for Jazz Tap Ensemble 1990-1996
 keyboardist for Moris Tepper 1987-1993
 Music Director/Pianist for "Woyzeck" (play) dir. John Wills Martin, Edinburgh 1988
 Music Director/Pianist for "The Lesson" (play) dir. Peter Brosius, Mark Taper Forum, Los Angeles 1989.  Louis was nominated for a 1990 Drama Logue award.
 Music Director/Pianist for "Rio Esmeralda" (play) dir. Peter Brosius, LATC and Reykjavik, Iceland 1987

Sound Editing

Louis edited sound with the Id Group, an audio post facility.

References 

38th Los Angeles Drama Critics Circle Award Nominations

1990 Drama-Logue Awards

External links 
 
 youtube channel

American jazz pianists
American male pianists
American jazz composers
Living people
21st-century American pianists
American male jazz composers
21st-century American male musicians
Year of birth missing (living people)